Ommatokoita is a monotypic genus of copepods, the sole species being Ommatokoita elongata. However, a specimen has been found on the skin of Etmopterus princeps, which has been assigned to the genus but not the species.

The parasites cause severe visual impairment, but it is thought that the sharks do not rely on keen eyesight for their survival. It was speculated that the copepod may be bioluminescent and thus form a mutualistic relationship with the shark by attracting prey, but this hypothesis has not been verified.

References

Siphonostomatoida
Monotypic crustacean genera
Copepod genera